The Mixed Doubles Bern is an annual mixed doubles curling tournament on the ISS Mixed Doubles World Curling Tour. It is held annually in the Fall at Curling Bern in Bern, Switzerland.

The purse for the event is CHF 10,000 and its event categorization is 500 (highest calibre is 1000).

The event has been held since 2017.

Past champions

References

External links
Official Website

World Curling Tour events
Curling competitions in Switzerland
Sports competitions in Bern
Bern